Jeppson is a surname. Notable people with the surname include:

Hasse Jeppson (1925–2013), Swedish football striker
Janet Jeppson Asimov (1926–2019), American science fiction author, psychiatrist, and a psychoanalyst
John Jeppson (1844–1920), industrialist in Worcester, Massachusetts, founder of the Norton Company
Morris R. Jeppson (1922–2010), Second Lieutenant in the United States Army Air Forces during World War II

See also
Jeppsson
Jepson (disambiguation)